The 1970 USC Trojans baseball team represented the University of Southern California in the 1970 NCAA University Division baseball season. The team was coached Rod Dedeaux in his 29th season.

The Trojans won the College World Series, defeating the Florida State Seminoles in the championship game, starting a run of five consecutive national championships for USC.

Roster

Schedule 

! style="background:#FFCC00;color:#990000;"| Regular Season
|- 

|- align="center" bgcolor="ddffdd"
| February 27 ||  || 8–3 || 1–0 || –
|- align="center" bgcolor="#ffdddd"
| March 3 || at  || 6–8 || 1–1 || –
|- align="center" bgcolor="#ddffdd"
| March 6 ||  || 4–2 || 2–1 || –
|- align="center" bgcolor="#ddffdd"
| March 7 || at UC Santa Barbara || 4–2 || 3–1 || –
|- align="center" bgcolor="#ffdddd"
| March 7 || at UC Santa Barbara || 2–4 || 3–2 || –
|- align="center" bgcolor="ddffdd"
| March 10 ||  || 13–1 || 4–2 || –
|- align="center" bgcolor="ddffdd"
| March 13 || at  || 6–2 || 5–2 || –
|- align="center" bgcolor="ddffdd"
| March 14 || at Fresno State || 13–6 || 6–2 || –
|- align="center" bgcolor="ffdddd"
| March 14 || at Fresno State || 6–7 || 6–3 || –
|- align="center" bgcolor="ddffdd"
| March 17 ||  || 3–2 || 7–3 || –
|- align="center" bgcolor="ddffdd"
| March 20 ||  || 4–2 || 8–3 || –
|- align="center" bgcolor="ddffdd"
| March 20 || at Long Beach State || 8–1 || 9–3 || –
|- align="center" bgcolor="ddffdd"
| March 21 || BYU || 4–0 || 10–3 || –
|- align="center" bgcolor="ffdddd"
| March 21 || BYU || 4–8 || 10–4 || –
|- align="center" bgcolor="ffdddd"
| March 23 || vs.  || 9–10 || 10–5 || –
|- align="center" bgcolor="#ddffdd"
| March 23 || at  || 12–3 || 11–5 || –
|- align="center" bgcolor="#ddffdd"
| March 25 || vs.  || 11–9 || 12–5 || –
|- align="center" bgcolor="ddffdd"
| March 26 || vs.  || 7–5 || 13–5 || –
|- align="center" bgcolor="ddffdd"
| March 26 || vs.  || 11–2 || 14–5 || –
|- align="center" bgcolor="ddffdd"
| March 27 || vs.  || 4–0 || 15–5 || –
|- align="center" bgcolor="ddffdd"
| March 28 || vs.  || 5–2 || 16–5 || –
|- align="center" bgcolor="ffdddd"
| March 31 || at  || 2–7 || 16–6 || –
|-

|- align="center" bgcolor="ffdddd"
| April 1 || at  || 7–9 || 16–7 || –
|- align="center" bgcolor="ddffdd"
| April 2 ||  || 4–3 || 17–7 || –
|- align="center" bgcolor="ddffdd"
| April 3 ||  || 3–2 || 18–7 || –
|- align="center" bgcolor="ddffdd"
| April 4 || San Diego State || 14–2 || 19–7 || –
|- align="center" bgcolor="ddffdd"
| April 4 || San Diego State || 8–1 || 20–7 || –
|- align="center" bgcolor="ddffdd"
| April 6 ||  || 7–4 || 21–7 || –
|- align="center" bgcolor="ddffdd"
| April 7 || San Fernando Valley State || 4–1 || 22–7 || –
|- align="center" bgcolor="#ddffdd"
| April 11 ||  || 8–2 || 23–7 || 1–0
|- align="center" bgcolor="ddffdd"
| April 13 || at Cal State Los Angeles || 5–4 || 24–7 || –
|- align="center" bgcolor="ddffdd"
| April 17 || at  || 4–2 || 25–7 || 2–0
|- align="center" bgcolor="ddffdd"
| April 18 || at Stanford || 3–0 || 26–7 || 3–0
|- align="center" bgcolor="ffdddd"
| April 18 || at Stanford || 1–2 || 26–8 || 3–1
|- align="center" bgcolor="ddffdd"
| April 20 || at  || 16–5 || 27–8 || –
|- align="center" bgcolor="ffdddd"
| April 21 || Chapman || 3–5 || 27–9 || –
|- align="center" bgcolor="ffdddd"
| April 24 || Stanford || 2–7 || 27–10 || 3–2
|- align="center" bgcolor="ddffdd"
| April 25 || California || 10–0 || 28–10 || 4–2
|- align="center" bgcolor="ffdddd"
| April 25 || California || 5–14 || 28–11 || 4–3
|- align="center" bgcolor="ffdddd"
| April 28 || at  || 2–3 || 28–12 || –
|-

|- align="center" bgcolor="ddffdd"
| May 1 ||  || 9–3 || 29–12 || 5–3
|- align="center" bgcolor="ddffdd"
| May 1 || Washington || 6–4 || 30–12 || 6–3
|- align="center" bgcolor="ddffdd"
| May 2 ||  || 7–3 || 31–12 || 7–3
|- align="center" bgcolor="ddffdd"
| May 2 || Washington State || 12–5 || 32–12 || 8–3
|- align="center" bgcolor="ddffdd"
| May 5 || Cal Poly Pomona || 11–8 || 33–12 || –
|- align="center" bgcolor="ddffdd"
| May 9 ||  || 6–0 || 34–12 || 9–3
|- align="center" bgcolor="ddffdd"
| May 15 || at UCLA || 8–5 || 35–12 || 10–3
|- align="center" bgcolor="ddffdd"
| May 15 || UCLA || 4–1 || 36–12 || 11–3
|-

|-
! style="background:#FFCC00;color:#990000;"| Post–Season
|-
|-

|- align="center" bgcolor="ddffdd"
| May 21 || vs. Oregon State || Bovard Field || 11–3 || 37–12
|- align="center" bgcolor="ddffdd"
| May 22 || vs. UCLA || Bovard Field || 8–4 || 38–12
|- align="center" bgcolor="ddffdd"
| May 23 || vs. UCLA || Bovard Field || 7–1 || 39–12
|-

|- align="center" bgcolor="ddffdd"
| May 29 || vs. Santa Clara || Bovard Field || 12–1 || 40–12
|- align="center" bgcolor="ddffdd"
| May 30 || vs. Santa Clara || Bovard Field || 6–1 || 41–12
|-

|- align="center" bgcolor="ffdddd"
| June 12 || vs.  || Rosenblatt Stadium || 1–4 || 41–13
|- align="center" bgcolor="ddffdd"
| June 13 || vs.  || Rosenblatt Stadium || 7–1 || 42–13
|- align="center" bgcolor="ddffdd"
| June 15 || vs. Dartmouth || Rosenblatt Stadium || 6–1 || 43–13
|- align="center" bgcolor="ddffdd"
| June 16 || vs. Texas || Rosenblatt Stadium || 8–7 || 44–13
|- align="center" bgcolor="ddffdd"
| June 18 || vs. Florida State || Rosenblatt Stadium || 2–1 || 45–13
|-

Awards and honors 
Frank Alfano
 College World Series All-Tournament Team
 All-Pacific-8 Second Team

Jim Barr
 College World Series All-Tournament Team
 All-Pacific-8 Second Team

Dave Kingman
 All-America First Team
 All-Pacific-8 Second Team

Cal Meier
 All-America Second Team
 All-Pacific-8 Conference First Team

Dan Stoligrosz
 College World Series All-Tournament Team
 All-Pacific-8 Conference First Team

Brent Strom
 All-America First Team
 All-Pacific-8 Conference First Team

Trojans in the 1970 MLB Draft 
The following members of the USC baseball program were drafted in the 1970 Major League Baseball Draft.

June regular draft

June secondary draft

January secondary draft

References 

USC
USC Trojans baseball seasons
College World Series seasons
NCAA Division I Baseball Championship seasons
Pac-12 Conference baseball champion seasons
USC Trojans